Robert Coronado (born August 3, 1996) is an American soccer player who plays for Rio Grande Valley FC in the USL Championship.

Career

Youth and college 
Coronado played four years of college soccer at Cal State Fullerton between 2014 and 2018, including a red-shirted 2017 season, making 86 appearances, scoring five goals and tallying 18 assists.

While at college, Coronado appeared for USL Premier Development League sides FC Golden State Force and Orange County SC U23.

Professional 
On March 8, 2019, Coronado signed for USL Championship side Rio Grande Valley FC.

On January 21, 2021, Coronado joined USL Championship side OKC Energy FC following his release from Rio Grande Valley.

On February 4, 2022, it was announced that Rio Grande Valley FC had re-signed Coronado ahead of their 2022 season.

References

External links 
  Cal State Fullerton bio

1996 births
Living people
American soccer players
Association football defenders
Cal State Fullerton Titans men's soccer players
FC Golden State Force players
OKC Energy FC players
Orange County SC U-23 players
People from La Habra, California
Rio Grande Valley FC Toros players
Soccer players from California
Sportspeople from Orange County, California
USL Championship players
USL League Two players